Ray Brooks may refer to:

Ray Brooks (actor) (born 1939), English TV and film actor
Arthur Raymond Brooks (1895–1991), World War I pilot, known as Ray
Ramy Brooks (born 1968), American dog musher, known as Ray

See also
Ray Brooks School, Benoit, Mississippi, U.S.